Qarabulaq is a village in the Gobustan Rayon of Azerbaijan.

References 

Populated places in Gobustan District